Spicy! is an album by jazz organist Richard "Groove" Holmes which was recorded in 1966 and released on the Prestige label.

Reception

Allmusic awarded the album 3 stars stating "Although this is dependable B-3 Hammond soul-jazz, some of the songs selected for this set, such as "If I Had a Hammer" and "Never on Sunday," are inappropriate for soul-jazz translation. On the other hand, the adaptation of Luiz Bonfá's "Manhã de Carnaval" is good, and Nat Adderley's "Work Song" is a classic that's hard to mess up".

Track listing 
 "If I Had a Hammer" (Lee Hays, Pete Seeger) - 4:30  
 "Never on Sunday" (Manos Hadjidakis, Billy Towne) - 2:35  
 "A Day in the Life of a Fool" [AKA "Manhã de Carnaval"] (Luiz Bonfá, Antônio Maria) - 5:34  
 "1-2-3"  (John Madara, David White, Len Barry) - 4:00
 "Boo-D-Doo" (Richard "Groove" Holmes) - 3:30  
 "Work Song" (Nat Adderley) - 6:05  
 "When Lights Are Low" (Benny Carter, Spencer Williams) - 5:53  
 "Old Folks" (Dedette Lee Hill, Willard Robison) - 8:25

Personnel 
Richard "Groove" Holmes - organ
Gene Edwards, Joe Jones - guitar
George Randall - drums
Richie Landrum - congas

References 

Richard Holmes (organist) albums
1967 albums
Prestige Records albums
Albums recorded at Van Gelder Studio
Albums produced by Cal Lampley